A Fiery Serpent (also known as a snake-Lubac, Letun, Letuchy, Litavets, Maniac, nalyot, ognyanny and prelestnik) (Russian: Огненный змей) (Ukrainian: перелесник) is an evil entity common to Slavic mythology, which presents itself as an anthropomorphic snake demon.

Description
The Fiery Serpent generally resembles a glowing, fiery rocket, a flaming broom, or a ball of blue fire. According to the mythology, it is an evil spirit that reveals itself at night. The serpent has been portrayed as a spirit that presents itself as the form of a lost love to widows or women grieving the loss of a lover. In their grief, and their desperation to be rejoined with their lost love, women do not recognize the serpent and become convinced that their lover has returned.

The fiery serpent lacks the ability to hear and speak properly. It is told that those who are visited by the serpent experience weight loss, exhibit signs of insanity and eventually commit suicide.

Myths about the fiery serpent 
According to Eastern Ukrainian legends, whilst traveling, the fiery serpent throws beautiful gifts to grieving women and villagers, including beads, rings and handkerchiefs.

The serpent is often represented in Slavic folk tales as entering a person's house through the chimney. The serpent may bring gifts of gold - but those gifts turn to horse manure at sunrise. In addition, victims of the serpent often experience hallucinations, including visions of supernatural torment, such as suckling on breasts which excrete blood rather than milk. The fiery serpent has no spinal cord and cannot correctly pronounce certain words. For example, instead of "Jesus Christ," the serpent may say "Sus Christ", or "Chudoroditsa," in place of "Bogoroditsa" (mother of God), the woman who gave birth to a miracle.

If a child is born out of a relationship with the serpent, then that child is believed to be born with black skin, with hooves instead of feet, eyes without eyelids and a cold body. Such a child is fated to live a very short life.

Sources of information 
Myths about the fiery serpent are found in Serbian epic songs in Russian bylinas, fairy tales and conspiracies, as well as the hagiographic Story of Peter and Fevronia of Murom, which is based on folk material.

The origin of the image 
Visible manifestations of a fiery serpent show fireballs flying deviated or horizontal, which can be seen rushing through the air in the form of long, wide ribbons of red sparks. The image of a flying dragon was associated with signs of temporary insanity, depression, or hallucinations - particularly in women who have lost their loved ones.

Fiery serpents in literature 
The image of a fiery serpent was described by the Russian poet Afanasy Afanasievich Fet in his ballad, "Snake", written in 1847. The image of the tempter was described by the Ukrainian writer Lesia Ukrainka in the work «Forest Song»

References 
 М. Забылин «Русский народ, его обычаи, обряды, предания, суеверия и поэзия», — М: Амрита, 2011, С. 204—205. 
 Е. Е. Левкиевская «Мифы русского народа», — М: Астрель, 2011, С. 442—445. 
 «Славянская мифология. Энциклопедический словарь» (издание РАН), — М, Эллис Лак, 1995, С. 283—284. 

Slavic weather deities
Dragons
Russian mythology
Magic (supernatural)
Slavic demons
Legendary serpents
Fire in culture